Acrolepiopsis kostjuki is a moth of the family Acrolepiidae. It is found in China (Shaanxi, Tianjin), Mongolia and Russia (Amurskaya oblast, Zabaykalye).

The larvae feed on Zizyphus jujuba.

References

Acrolepiidae
Moths described in 1998